Sakaling Hindi Makarating (English: In Case They Don't Arrive) is a 2016 Philippine independent road drama film co-written, shot, co-produced, and directed by Ice Idanan in her directorial debut. The film stars Alessandra de Rossi, Teri Malvar, JC Santos and Pepe Herrera. It is an official entry to the 2nd CineFilipino Film Festival, where it won seven awards including Best Picture and Best Director.

The film had its theatrical release in the Philippines on February 1, 2017.

Plot
Cielo (Alessandra de Rossi), a 27-year-old workaholic is laid-off from work with a big severance check. She is then forced to move into a smaller place, an apartment that she bought with her ex-fiance. With nothing to do but to nurse a broken heart, she feels like her life is beginning to take a turn for the worse.
One day, an anonymous postcard arrives. These postcards arrive from different places, and attached to them are different artworks, made and written by the same hand. She grows fond of these letters and feels a sense of intimacy with the author.
With the help of the anonymous postcards and her new neighbor Paul (Pepe Herrera), she finally decides to go on a trip using the postcards as a guide, rediscovering not only her country but also herself. Lessons are learned and friendships are made as the story of Cielo and the anonymous writer unfolds.

Cast

Alessandra de Rossi as Cielo
Therese Malvar as Sol
Pepe Herrera as Paul
JC Santos as Manuel
Elijah Canlas as Benjie
Karen delos Reyes
Lesley Lina
Hiraya Plata as Aisha
Jay Gonzaga as Mark
Gabriela Sebastian
Marius Talampas
Irma Adlawan

Critical reception
Oggs Cruz from Rappler states in his review that "Given that the film teases about the identity of a certain person who would have completed Cielo's thirst for the perfect romance, its ending, which keeps things within the universe of uncertainty, is delightfully bittersweet." He also praised Idanan's photography calling it "evidently beautiful".

Awards

References

External links

2010s road movies
2016 films
Philippine independent films
Philippine road movies
2016 directorial debut films
2016 independent films